The Kaniadakis Weibull distribution (or κ-Weibull distribution) is a probability distribution arising as a generalization of the Weibull distribution. It is one example of a Kaniadakis κ-distribution. The κ-Weibull distribution has been adopted successfully for describing a wide variety of complex systems in seismology, economy, epidemiology, among many others.

Definitions

Probability density function 
The Kaniadakis κ-Weibull distribution is exhibits power-law right tails, and it has the following probability density function:

 

The Weibull distribution is recovered as

Cumulative distribution function 
The cumulative Weibull distribution is recovered in the classical limit .

Survival distribution and hazard functions 
The survival distribution function of κ-Weibull distribution is given by

The survival Weibull distribution is recovered in the classical limit .

The cumulative κ-Weibull distribution is related to the κ-hazard function by the following expression:

where

is the cumulative κ-hazard function. The cumulative hazard function of the Weibull distribution is recovered in the classical limit :  .

Properties

Moments, median and mode 
The κ-Weibull distribution has moment of order  given by

The median and the mode are:

Quantiles 
The quantiles are given by the following expressionwith .

Gini coefficient 
The Gini coefficient is:

Asymptotic behavior 
The κ-Weibull distribution II behaves asymptotically as follows:

Related distributions
The κ-Weibull distribution is a generalization of:
κ-Exponential distribution of type II, when ;

Applications 
The κ-Weibull distribution has been applied in several areas, such as:
 In economy, for analyzing personal income models, in order to accurately describing simultaneously the income distribution among the richest part and the great majority of the population.
 In seismology, the κ-Weibull represents the statistical distribution of magnitude of the earthquakes distributed across the Earth, generalizing the Gutenberg–Richter law, and the interval distributions of seismic data, modeling extreme-event return intervals.
 In epidemiology, the κ-Weibull distribution presents a universal feature for epidemiological analysis.

See also 

 Giorgio Kaniadakis
 Kaniadakis statistics
 Kaniadakis distribution
 Kaniadakis κ-Exponential distribution
 Kaniadakis κ-Gaussian distribution
 Kaniadakis κ-Gamma distribution
 Kaniadakis κ-Logistic distribution
 Kaniadakis κ-Erlang distribution

References

External links
Kaniadakis Statistics on arXiv.org

Statistics
Probability distributions
Continuous distributions
Exponential family distributions
Survival analysis